is a 1991 action platform game by Wolf Team. It was self-published in Japan for the Sega Mega-CD and the Sega Genesis in North America by Renovation three months later. As with Sol-Feace, the Mega-CD release has a Mixed Mode CD soundtrack along with animated cutscenes created by Madhouse. It is the second story in a trilogy of games which include El Viento (1991) and Anett Futatabi (1993).

Gameplay

As a 2D side-scrolling game in which the hero uses a whip, the gameplay and design are often compared to the Castlevania series. In addition to the whip, there are three other weapons to be found; however, they are only used once in certain areas. The three additional weapons are exploding rocks, a morning star, and a hammerlike weapon. The adventure takes Earnest to destinations which include raiding tombs in Mexico, Peru, moving trains, a forest, and the Grand Canyons, while attempting to save the world. Unlike most platform games on the Genesis/Mega Drive, the character Earnest Evans is made up of several sprites to give him a fluid ragdoll-like movement.

Plot

In the 1930s, a man known as Earnest Evans had learned of three ancient idols which hold enough power to destroy the Earth. Evans had decided to search the world to find the scattered idols, but was injured before he could find all three. Now, many years later, his grandson, Earnest Evans III, continues his grandfather's quest to save humanity from total annihilation. However, a rival treasure hunter named Brady Tresidder also seeks the idols to bring the world's destruction. Evans must find the treasures before Tresidder does. During his journey, Evans stumbles upon a green-haired girl named Annet Myer in some ruins in Peru who decides to accompany him for the rest of his adventures. The two encounter a mysterious figure by the name of Sigfried, who has unknown motives, but seems to know a lot about Hastur and his cult.

References

External links

1991 video games
Adventures of Earnest Evans and Annet Myer
Sega Genesis games
Sega CD games
Telenet Japan games
Video games set in the 1930s
Wolf Team games
Video games developed in Japan
Video games scored by Motoi Sakuraba
Video games set in Arizona
Video games set in Peru
Video games set in Mexico
Single-player video games